Grammy-nominated producer, songwriter, and bassist Jayme David Silverstein began playing the electric bass at age 12 after years of playing classical piano. Jayme is  Grammy-nominated for his production on Miguel’s “Candles in the Sun” on the album “Kaleidoscope Dream” as well as being Grammy-nominated for his work on Miguel’s Wild Heart. Other major label placements include Kaskade, Morgan Page, John Splithoff, and the Universal Republic artist Angelic Montero which he helped develop and coproduced everything song on her debut release ”U Get Me.”

A graduate of the Manhattan School of Music, Jayme David has worked with Grammy-Award-winning artists Miguel, Alicia Keys, Roberta Flack, Philip Bailey, Andrae Crouch, Estelle, Narada Michael Walden, and Valerie Simpson. Other notable artists include J Cole, LIRA, Wiz Khalifa, Snoop Dogg, Nico and Vinz, Cher Lloyd,  Swizz Beats and Jay Sean,  Jayme David has also performed on every top TV spot such as David Letterman, Jay Leno, Jimmy Fallon and SNL etc

References 

American bass guitarists
Record producers from New York (state)
Living people
American male bass guitarists
Year of birth missing (living people)